Michael Peter Leopold Hamburger  (22 March 1924 – 7 June 2007) was a noted German-British translator, poet, critic, memoirist and academic. He was known in particular for his translations of Friedrich Hölderlin, Paul Celan, Gottfried Benn and W. G. Sebald from German, and his work in literary criticism. The publisher Paul Hamlyn (1926–2001) was his younger brother.

Life and work
Michael Hamburger was born in Berlin into a Jewish family that left for the UK in 1933, and settled in London.  He was educated at Westminster School and Christ Church, Oxford and served in the British Army from 1943 to 1947 in Italy and Austria. After that he completed his degree, and wrote for a time. He took a position at University College London in 1951, and then at the University of Reading in 1955. There followed many further academic positions in the UK and the US. Hamburger held temporary appointments in German at Mount Holyoke College (1966–7), the University of Buffalo (1969), Stony Brook University (1970), Wesleyan University (1971), the University of Connecticut (1972), the University of California at San Diego (1973), the University of South Carolina (1973), and Boston University (1975 and 1977). He resettled permanently in England in 1978, the year he became a part-time professor at the University of Essex.

Hamburger published translations of many of the most important German-language writers, particularly poets.  His work was recognised with numerous awards, including the Aristeion Prize in 1990, and the Order of the British Empire in 1992. Hamburger lived in Middleton, Suffolk, and appeared as a character in W. G. Sebald's The Rings of Saturn. A few months before his death he was visited by the artist Tacita Dean, whose poignant film Michael Hamburger focuses on the man and his home and the bonding of the man and his apple orchard.

Representative works included The Truth of Poetry (1968), a major work of criticism. His Collected Poems, 1941–1994 (1995) drew on around twenty collections. Hamburger himself commented unhappily on the habit that reviewers have of greeting publication of his own poetry with a ritualised "Michael Hamburger, better known as a translator...". Perhaps ironically, his original poetry is better known in its German translations, by the Austrian poet and translator Peter Waterhouse. He often commented on the literary life: the first edition of his autobiography came out with the title A Mug's Game, a quotation from T. S. Eliot, whom Hamburger greatly admired, and to whose sixtieth-birthday biblio-symposium he contributed an eponymous poem of four stanzas which tells its own story.

Michael Hamburger was honoured with the Johann-Heinrich-Voß-Preis für Übersetzung in 1964 and with the Petrarca-Preis in 1992. He died on 7 June 2007 at his home in Suffolk.

References
String of Beginnings: Intermittent Memoirs 1924 to 1954 (Skoob Books Publishing, 1991), his autobiography, edited by Lucien Jenkins
Michael Hamburger in Conversation with Peter Dale by Peter Dale

Selected bibliography

Translations
New Poems Günter Grass (translator) English translation Harcourt, Brace,& World, Inc. Copyright 1968
Charles Baudelaire, Twenty Prose Poems (translator), London, Poetry London, 1946 (revised ed. San Francisco, City Light Books 1988)
Flowering Cactus: poems 1942–1949, Aldington, Hand and Flower Press, 1950 – out of print
Poems of Hölderlin (translator), Poetry London 1943, (revised ed. as Holderlin: His Poems, Harvill Press, 1952) – out of print
Ludwig van Beethoven, Letters, Journals and Conversations. London, Thames & Hudson, 1951 – out of print.Trakl, Decline (translator), St. Ives, Guido Morris/Latin Press, 1952 – out of printA. Goes, The Burnt Offering (translator), London, Gollancz, 1956 – out of printBertolt Brecht, Tales from the Calendar (translator), London, Methuen, 1961 (reissued London, Lion & Unicorn Press 1980) – out of printHugo von Hofmannsthal, Poems and Verse Plays (translator with others), Routledge & K. Paul, and New York, Bollingen Foundation, 1961 – out of printModern German Poetry 1910–1960 (translator with C Middleton), Routledge, and New York, McGibbon & Kee, 1962 – out of printJ C F Hölderlin, Selected Verse (translator), Harmondsworth, Middlesex, Penguin, 1961 (latest ed. London, Anvil, 1986)Nelly Sachs, Selected Poems (translator), Jonathan Cape and New York, Farrar Straus and Giroux, 1968 – out of printHans Magnus Enzensberger, The Poems of Hans Magnus Enzensberger (translator with J Rothenberg and the author), London, Secker & Warburg, 1968 – out of printH M Enzensberger, Poems for People Who Don't Read Poems (translator), Secker & Warburg, 1968 – out of printAn Unofficial Rilke (translator), London, Anvil Press, 1981 – out of printPaul Celan, Poems (translator), Manchester, Carcanet, 1972 (new enlarged ed. as Poems of Paul Celan, New York, Persea, 1988 and 2002, and Anvil Press, 2007)Friedrich Hölderlin, Selected poems and Fragments (translator), Penguin Classics, 1998 (new ed. 2007)
W. G. Sebald, After Nature (translator), London, Hamish Hamilton, 2002
W. G. Sebald, Unrecounted (translator), Hamish Hamilton, 2004

ProseReason and Energy, London, Routledge & K. Paul, 1957 – out of printFrom Prophecy to Exorcism: the Premisses of Modern German Literature, Longmans, 1965 – out of printThe Truth of Poetry, London, Weidenfeld & Nicolson, First published in 1969, (latest ed. Anvil, 1996)Testimonies, Selected Shorter Prose 1950–1987, New York, St Martin's Press, 1989 A Mug's Game (memoir), Carcanet, 1973, (revised ed. as String of Beginnings) – out of printString of Beginnings (memoir), Skoob Seriph, 1991Philip Larkin: A Retrospect, London, Enitharmon Press, 2002 — edition limited to 90 copies plus 20 hors commercePoetry
 Flowering Cactus. Poems 1942–1949. Hand & Flower Press, Aldington 1950
 Poems 1950–1951. Hand & Flower Press, Aldington 1952
 The Dual Site. Poems. Routledge & Kegan Paul; London 1958
 Weather and Season. New Poems. Longmans, London 1963; Atheneum, New York 1963
 Feeding the Chickadees. Turret Books, London 1968
 Penguin Modern Poets. No. 14. Penguin Books, Harmondsworth 1969 (with Alan Brownjohn and Charles Tomlinson)
 Travelling. Fulcrum Press, London 1969, 
 Travelling I–V. Agenda Editions, London 1973, 
 Ownerless Earth. New & Selected poems. Carcanet Press, Cheadle, Cheshire 1973, 
 Travelling VI. I.M. Imprimit, London 1975
 Real Estate. Carcanet, Manchester 1977, 
 Moralities. Morden Tower Publications, Newcastle-upon-Tyne 1977, 
 Variations in Suffolk, IV. Sceptre Press, Knotting 1980
 Variations. Carcanet New Press, Manchester 1981, 
 In Suffolk. Five Seasons Press, Hereford 1982
 Collected Poems. 1941–1983. Carcanet Press, Manchester 1984, 
 Trees. Embers Handpress, Llangynog 1988, 
 Selected Poems. Carcanet, Manchester 1988, 
 Roots in the Air. Anvil Press Poetry, London 1991, 
 Collected Poems. 1941–1994. Anvil Press Poetry, London 1995, 
 Late. Anvil Press Poetry, London 1997, 
 Intersections. Shorter Poems 1994–2000. Anvil Press Poetry, London 2000, 
 From a Diary of Non-Events. Anvil Press Poetry, London 2002, 
 Wild and Wounded. Shorter Poems 2000–2003. Anvil Press Poetry, London 2004, 
 Circling the Square. Anvil Press Poetry, London 2006, 

Other
 Hamburger, Michael. "T. S. Eliot." In T. S. Eliot: A Symposium, edited by Richard March and Tambimuttu, 178. London: Editions Poetry, 1948.

Notes

References
 Theo Breuer, Still He is Turning – Michael Hamburger; in: T.B., Aus dem Hinterland. Lyrik nach 2000, Edition YE 2005.

External links
Obituary in The Independent
Obituary from the Times newspaper
[http://books.guardian.co.uk/obituaries/story/0,,2099883,00.html Obituary from The Guardian Unlimited] Poet, translator and academic, more acclaimed in Germany than in Britain
Michael Hamburger at the Poetry Archive
Remembering Poet and Translator Michael Hamburger an appreciation by Joshua Cohen at The Jewish Daily Forward published 19 June 2007
I am a survivor from a different culture interview with Michael Hamburger, conducted by Lidia Vianu, Published in The European English Messenger, Spring 2006 (pp. 35–37)
"...a few things on behalf of the fine English poet Michael Hamburger" poet Mark Scroggins's appreciation for the work of Michael Hamburger
Unpicked Apples – Memories of Michael Hamburger by Will Stone published 10 March 2010
 Archival material at 

1924 births
2007 deaths
Academics of University College London
Academics of the University of Reading
Alumni of Christ Church, Oxford
British Army personnel of World War II
English Jews
German–English translators
Jewish poets
Jewish emigrants from Nazi Germany to the United Kingdom
Officers of the Order of the British Empire
People educated at Westminster School, London
Members of the Academy of Arts, Berlin
20th-century translators
English male poets
20th-century English poets
German emigrants to the United Kingdom
Naturalised citizens of the United Kingdom
Writers from London
20th-century English male writers